Pegasus is a winged divine stallion, usually depicted as pure white in color, in Greek mythology.  He was sired by Poseidon, in his role as horse-god, and foaled by the Gorgon Medusa. He was the brother of Chrysaor, born at a single birthing when his mother was decapitated by Perseus. Greco-Roman poets wrote about his ascent to heaven after his birth and his obeisance to Zeus, king of the gods, who instructed him to bring lightning and thunder from Olympus.

Pegasus is the creator of Hippocrene, the fountain on Mount Helicon. He was captured by the Greek hero Bellerophon, near the fountain Peirene, with the help of Athena and Poseidon. Pegasus allowed Bellerophon to ride him in order to defeat the monster Chimera, which led to many more exploits. Bellerophon later fell from Pegasus's back while trying to reach Mount Olympus. Both Pegasus and Bellerophon were said to have died at the hands of Zeus for trying to reach Olympus. 

Pegasus was eventually brought to Olympus by Zeus. There, he was stabled next to Zeus' thunderbolts. One of his duties included carrying Zeus' thunderbolts. He was eventually turned into a constellation. Pegasus is the subject of a very rich iconography, especially through the ancient Greek pottery and paintings and sculptures of the Renaissance.

Etymology 

The poet Hesiod presents a folk etymology of the name Pegasus as derived from   'spring, well', referring to "the pegai of Okeanos, where he was born".

The proponents of this etymology adduce the role of Pegasus, reported as early as Hesiod, as the bringer of thunderbolts to Zeus. That interpretation was first suggested in 1952 and remains widely accepted, but Robin Lane Fox (2009) has criticized it as implausible.

Michael Brown, who has been studying ancient and medieval Greek poetry in the context of the Greek-North European dialogue, has concluded from his studies that the word Pegasus is a pre-Celtic-PIE word, one that did not evolve into one of the numerous common names listed in both Greek and Western languages. This concept is discussed further in "Linguistics and Classical Theology", by William S. R. Miller, which is based on his work with Charles F. G. Osterhaus's analysis of the word and its relationships to Greek and Italian. The relationship of "Pegasus" to "Cyrillic" is discussed further in his Phrygian Monikers and the Naming of Greek Pronunciation "Cyrillic or Pene-Orthogyrin" and "Pegasus" as an Early Semitic construct.

Springs 
According to early myths, everywhere the winged horse struck his hoof to the earth, an inspiring water spring burst forth. One of these springs was upon the Muses' Mount Helicon, the Hippocrene ("horse spring"). Antoninus Liberalis has suggested, that it was opened at the behest of Poseidon to prevent the mountain swelling with rapture at the song of the Muses. Another spring associated with Pegasus was at Troezen. Hesiod relates how Pegasus was peacefully drinking from a spring when the hero Bellerophon captured him.

Thunderbolts 
Hesiod wrote that Pegasus carried thunderbolts for Zeus.

Birth 
There are several versions of the birth of the winged stallion and his brother Chrysaor in the far distant place at the edge of Earth, Hesiod's "springs of Oceanus", which encircles the inhabited earth, where Perseus found Medusa:

One is that they sprang from the blood issuing from Medusa's neck as Perseus was beheading her, similar to the manner in which Athena was born from the head of Zeus after he swallowed her pregnant mother. 

In another version, when Perseus beheaded Medusa, the brothers were born of the Earth, when the Gorgon's blood fell upon her. A variation of this story holds that they were formed from the mingling of Medusa's blood, pain, and sea foam, implying that Poseidon had involvement in their making. 

The last version bears resemblance to Hesiod's account of the birth of Aphrodite from the foam created when the severed genitals of Uranus were cast into the sea by Cronus.

Bellerophon 

Pegasus aided the hero Bellerophon in his fight against the Chimera. There are varying tales about how Bellerophon found Pegasus; the most common being that the hero was told by Polyeidos to sleep in the temple of Athena, where the goddess visited him in the night and presented him with a golden bridle. The next morning, still clutching the bridle, Bellerophon found Pegasus drinking at the Pierian spring, caught him, and eventually tamed him.

Perseus 
Michaud's Biographie universelle relates that when Pegasus was born, he flew to where thunder and lightning are released. Then, according to certain versions of the myth, Athena tamed him and gave him to Perseus, who flew to Ethiopia to help Andromeda.

Olympus 

After Bellerophon fell off Pegasus while trying to reach Olympus, Pegasus and Athena left him and continued to Olympus where he was stabled with other steeds belonging to Zeus, and was given the task of carrying Zeus' thunderbolts, along with other members of his entourage, his attendants/handmaidens/shield bearers/shieldmaidens, Astrape and Bronte. 

Because of his years of faithful service to Zeus, Pegasus was later honoured with transformation into a constellation. On the day of his catasterism, when Zeus transformed him into a constellation, a single feather fell to Earth near the city of Tarsus.

Legacy

In heraldry 
The pegasus became a common element in British heraldry, appearing chiefly as a supporter or a crest. Pegasi may also appear upon escutcheons, although this is rare. A pegasus rampant is featured on the arms of the Inner Temple, while those of the Richardson family contain a rare depiction of a pegasus sejant.

World War II emblem 
During World War II, the silhouetted image of Bellerophon the warrior, mounted on the winged Pegasus, was adopted by the United Kingdom's newly raised parachute troops in 1941 as their upper sleeve insignia. 

The image clearly symbolized a warrior arriving at a battle by air, the same tactics used by paratroopers. The square upper-sleeve insignia comprised Bellerophon/Pegasus in light blue on a maroon background. One source suggests that the insignia was designed by famous English novelist Daphne du Maurier, who was wife of the commander of the 1st Airborne Division (and later the expanded British Airborne Forces), General Frederick "Boy" Browning. According to the British Army Website, the insignia was designed by the celebrated East Anglian painter Major Edward Seago in May 1942. The maroon background on the insignia was later used again by the Airborne Forces when they adopted the famous maroon beret in Summer 1942. The beret was the origin of the German nickname for British airborne troops, the Red Devils. Today's Parachute Regiment carries on the maroon beret tradition. The selection process for the elite Parachute Regiment is called Pegasus Company (often abbreviated to "P Company"). 

In 2015 it was announced that the units of 16 Air Assault Brigade would once again use the Pegasus insignia after a 15-year hiatus.

During the airborne phase of the Normandy invasion on the night of 5–6 June 1944, British 6th Airborne Division captured all its key objectives in advance of the seaborne assault, including the capture and holding at all costs of a vital bridge over the Caen Canal, near Ouistreham. In memory of their tenacity, the bridge has been known ever since as Pegasus Bridge.

The Tuscan National Liberation Committee during the German occupation of Italy also had a Pegasus as its emblem. The winged horse is still featured on the Tuscan flag and coat of arms.

In popular culture 

The winged horse has provided an instantly recognizable corporate logo or emblem of inspiration. Ecuador launched its weather satellite, named Pegaso (Pegasus in Spanish), on 26 April 2013 but it was damaged by Russian space debris. Pegasus Airlines (Turkish: Pegasus Hava Taşımacılığı A.Ş.) is a low-cost airline headquartered in the Kurtköy area of Pendik, Istanbul, Turkey. Mobil Oil has had a Pegasus as its company logo since its affiliation with Magnolia Petroleum Company in the 1930s.

Gallery

See also 

 Uchchaihshravas
 Hybrid creatures in mythology
 List of fictional horses
 List of hybrid creatures in mythology
 Flying horses
 Ethiopian pegasus
 Haizum
 Hippogriff
 Luno the White Stallion
 Pegasides
 Pegasus and Dragon (statue)
 Qianlima
 Tulpar
 Wind horse
 Winged unicorn

References

External links 
 
 

 
Medusa
Children of Poseidon
Horses in mythology